Mitreski is a Macedonian surname. Notable people with the surname include:

 Aleksandar Mitreski (born 1980), Macedonian footballer
 Igor Mitreski (born 1979), Macedonian footballer

See also
 Mitrevski, surname

Macedonian-language surnames